Mansfelder Land may refer to the following places in Germany:

 Mansfelder Land (district), a former county in the state of Saxony-Anhalt
 Mansfeld Land, a region in Saxony-Anhalt